Ephedroxena is a genus of moths belonging to the family Tineidae. It contains only one species, Ephedroxena incisoria, which is found in Guyana.

The wingspan is 8–9 mm. The head is light brassy-grey. The forewings are elongate and purplish-fuscous suffusedly mixed with dark fuscous. The hindwings are brassy-grey.

References

Tineidae
Monotypic moth genera
Moths of South America
Tineidae genera
Taxa named by Edward Meyrick